Robert M. Peak (May 30, 1927 – August 1, 1992) was an American commercial illustrator.  He is best known for his developments in the design of the modern film poster.

His artwork has been on the cover of Time magazine, TV Guide, and Sports Illustrated. He also illustrated advertisements and U.S. postage stamps.

Early life
Bob Peak was born in Denver, Colorado and grew up in Wichita, Kansas. He knew from an early age that he wanted to be a commercial illustrator. He majored in geology at the University of Wichita (nka Wichita State University) and got a part-time job in the art department of McCormick-Armstrong. After serving in the military during the Korean War, Peak transferred to the Art Center College of Design in Los Angeles, California, graduating in 1951.

In 1953, Peak moved to New York City and landed an Old Hickory Whiskey advertising campaign. His work went on to appear in major advertising and national magazines.

He was the father of Matthew Peak, who is best known for illustrating posters for the Nightmare on Elm Street film series.

Career
United Artists studio hired Peak in 1961 to design the poster images for the film West Side Story. The success of Peak's work on that film led to work on posters for designer Bill Gold, including the big-budget musicals My Fair Lady and Camelot. In the mid-1970s Peak's style would become familiar to fans of science fiction films when he created the poster art for the futuristic film Rollerball (1975), which was followed by the first six Star Trek films, Superman (1978), Excalibur (1981), both Derek Flint films, Apocalypse Now (1979), The Spy Who Loved Me and other James Bond concepts. By the 1980s only the film poster artist Drew Struzan was in as much demand by film directors.

Peak received a commission from the U.S. Postal Service to design 30 stamps for the 1984 Summer Olympics in Los Angeles and the 1984 Winter Olympics in Sarajevo, Yugoslavia.

From January 20 through April 17, 2011, the Academy of Motion Picture Arts and Sciences presented the "Bob Peak: Creating the Modern Movie Poster" exhibit at its headquarters building in Beverly Hills.

Peak taught in his own college and later at Art Students League of New York, Pratt Institute and Famous Artists School.

Bob Peak Illustrations 
 Apocalypse Now, movie poster illustration, 1979
Depicting the memorable scene in Francis Ford Coppola's film where Col. Kurtz, played by Marlon Brando, confronts Capt. Benjamin L. Willard, played by Martin Sheen, Peak's haunting illustration shows Brando's clenched fist squeezing a wet rag over his bald head, with water dripping from his forehead downwards off his pale, gaunt face. On October 4, 2021, this poster sold for $212,500, a world record for this artist.

Awards
In 1961, Peak was named Artist of the Year by the Graphic Artists Guild New York chapter. He won eight Awards of Excellence and four gold medals from Society of Illustrators. In 1977, the Society of Illustrators inducted him to its Hall of Fame. The Hollywood Reporter presented him the 1992 Key Art Award, now known as the Clio Entertainment Awards.

See also
 Bill Sienkiewicz
 Drew Struzan
 Frank Frazetta
 Frank McCarthy
 Howard Terpning
 Jack Davis
 John Alvin
 Mitchell Hooks
 Richard Amsel
 Robert McGinnis
 Saul Bass
 The Brothers Hildebrandt
 Tom Jung

References

External links
  A tribute to the legacy of Bob Peak featuring a gallery of Bob Peak's work, and special event showings
 
 Bob Peak artwork can be viewed at American Art Archives web site
 Critical essay on Bob Peak's art
  SANGUIN FINE ART GALLERY Bob Peak original art
 www.BOBPEAK.net official site by son Matthew Joseph Peak

1927 births
1992 deaths
20th-century American artists
20th-century American male artists
American illustrators
Film poster artists
Wichita State University alumni
Artists from Denver
Artists from Wichita, Kansas
American military personnel of the Korean War
Art Center College of Design alumni